Peep Show is a 1956 short film directed by Ken Russell. It was Russell's first movie.

He called it "a Fellini-esque bit of fun made by me, my first wife and two friends".

References

External links

Peep Show at Letterbox DVD
Peep Show at BFI

1956 short films
1956 films
British short films
Films directed by Ken Russell
1950s English-language films